Mengü is a common masculine Turkish given name. In Turkish, "Mengü" means "eternal", "without a beginning", and/or "having no beginning".

Real people

 Mengü Timur, khan of the Golden Horde in 1266–1280..
 Tuda Mengü, khan of the Golden Horde from 1280 to 1287
 Mengü Ertel, Turkish graphical artist (decorated as State Artist in 1998) .

See also 
 Mongke (disambiguation), the Mongolian equivalent

Turkish masculine given names